The Turkmenistan national badminton team represents Turkmenistan in international badminton team competitions. Turkmenistan is one of the most isolated countries in the world. The national team is managed by the Turkmenistan Badminton Federation.

The Turkmen national team has only competed in an international team tournament once and it was the Badminton Asia Junior Championships mixed team event in 2015.

Participation in Badminton Asia competitions 

Mixed team U19

Current squad 

Male players
Apov Nurmuhammet
Atliyev Kemal

Female players
Yana Sarkisyan
Alina Klychkova

References 

Badminton
National badminton teams